Monday Morning was an English-language weekly newspaper and then a weekly magazine published in Beirut, Lebanon every Monday. It was purchased by Dar Alf Leila Wa Leila publishing house which also published the Lebanese Arabic-language daily Al Bayrak. The print edition ceased as the media company folded.

References

Defunct magazines published in Lebanon
English-language magazines
Publications established in 1928
Magazines disestablished in 2011
Magazines published in Beirut
Weekly news magazines
Weekly magazines published in Lebanon